The ALFALFA research project is located at the Arecibo Observatory and started on February 4th 2005. It is still ongoing (April 2013). The name is the abbreviation of Arecibo Legacy Fast ALFA. ALFA is the abbreviation of Arecibo L-Band Feed Array.

The ALFA is a seven pixel detector and thus seven times faster than the previously used one pixel detectors. It is utilized in combination with the Arecibo Observatory telescope, a 305-meter radio telescope, which is currently (March 2009) the largest single-dish telescope in the world and therefore offers better resolution and sensitivity.

The speed of the ALFA permits it to survey large areas of the sky quickly, while the telescope provides unequalled sensitivity. With the seven feeds it is also possible to detect structures which are too big to be seen with radio interferometers or single-pixel detectors.

The ALFALFA survey is a blind extragalactic survey in neutral atomic hydrogen (HI) utilizing the ALFA at Arecibo Observatory. The telescope is not directed at preselected targets, but at one location for one night, allowing the sky to pass. This is called drift-scan. The goal is to find up to 25,000 galaxies in the course of 6–7 years. Some of the detected objects should be dark galaxies, consisting largely of dark matter and in this case hydrogen gas, but no or very few stars. These galaxies are not visible with optical telescopes and yet (March 2009) undiscovered.

Similar projects are HIPASS and HIJASS.

References

External links 
 ALFALFA Page
 ALFALFA Blog

Astronomical surveys
Observational astronomy